Fleshgod Apocalypse is an Italian symphonic death metal band. Formed in 2007, the group resides in Perugia and are currently signed to Nuclear Blast. They have released five full-length albums.

History

Formation and Oracles (2007–2009)
Fleshgod Apocalypse was formed in April 2007 by Francesco Paoli (formerly frontman of the band Hour of Penance). They recorded their first demo, Promo '07, at 16th Cellar Studio, in Rome, with producer Stefano "Saul" Morabito, releasing it shortly after. The demo was re-released the following year on a split CD with fellow Italian bands Septycal Gorge, Modus Delicti and Onirik. Fleshgod Apocalypse then signed to Neurotic Records. In early 2008 the band toured Europe, supporting bands like Behemoth, Origin, Dying Fetus, Hate Eternal, Suffocation, Napalm Death and many more.

In May 2008, the band recorded its first full-length album, Oracles. In December of that year the band decided to part ways with Neurotic Records and signed with Willowtip Records, who released Oracles in 2009. Shortly thereafter, new member, Tommaso Riccardi took over vocals and rhythm guitar, which were previously handled by Francesco Paoli, and Paoli took over the drums, replacing session drummer Francesco Struglia.

Mafia EP and Agony (2009–2012)
In 2010, the Mafia EP was recorded, again at 16th Cellar Studios, and was released via Willowtip Records. It includes four new tracks and a cover of the track "Blinded by Fear" by At the Gates. The band embarked on another European tour shortly after the end of the Mafia recording sessions, supporting Suffocation. Following this tour was a headlining tour of Russia.

Until 2010, band founder Francesco Paoli was simultaneously in his former band Hour of Penance doing vocals, as well as drumming in Fleshgod Apocalypse. He quit Hour of Penance to focus on Fleshgod Apocalypse full-time as drummer and song writer. In November 2010, the band signed a worldwide deal with record label Extreme Management Group, Inc. and began writing for the second full-length album. In May 2011 the band signed a worldwide deal with Nuclear Blast Records and began wrapping up work on their second album. During this time, another new member, Francesco Ferrini, the pianist and orchestrator of Oracles and Mafia, was added to the band as the full-time pianist and orchestrator. This addition honed Fleshgod Apocalypse's sound on their upcoming album.

The band released their second album, Agony, on 9 August 2011 in North America and 19 August 2011 in Europe. The iTunes version of Agony also includes a cover of the track "Heartwork" by Carcass.

Fleshgod Apocalypse took part in the 2011 Summer Slaughter Tour in North America, alongside co-headliners Whitechapel and The Black Dahlia Murder. The band toured the US with Decapitated in late 2011. In January 2012, they toured the UK with The Black Dahlia Murder and Skeletonwitch. During March 2012, Fleshgod Apocalypse toured South Africa, supported by local death metal acts.

On 22 December 2012, the band released a music video for "The Forsaking" from the album Agony.

Labyrinth (2012–2016)

Fleshgod Apocalypse's third album is entitled Labyrinth, and was released on 16 August 2013, in Europe, and on 20 August 2013, in North America, by Nuclear Blast. Labyrinth was recorded with Stefano Morabito at 16th Cellar Studio. It features guest contributions, and is a concept album about the myth of Labyrinth of Knossos and its analogies to modern times.

King, Trionfera's departure, and Riccardi's departure (2016–2018)
Fleshgod Apocalypse's fourth album entitled King was released on 5 February 2016. The work was an important success, peaking at #27 in the Billboard Chart.

On 10 October 2017 the band announced that Tommaso Riccardi had left the band. He was replaced by drummer Francesco Paoli who returned to lead vocals and rhythm guitar, while guitarist Fabio Bartoletti from Deceptionist joined the band on lead guitar. The band tapped David Folchitto as their live touring drummer, who stayed with the band for two years.

Veleno, official new members, and No (2019–present)
In 2019 Fleshgod Apocalypse released their fifth album, Veleno. The album continued and expanded on the style they had honed with King, and was accompanied by the release of two music videos directed by Giovanni Bucci for the songs "Sugar" and "Monnalisa". Loudwire named it one of the 50 best metal albums of 2019 and Metal Hammer ranked it 11th in their 2021 list of 25 best symphonic metal album of all time. In April 2019, it was announced that the band would be touring with Hypocrisy in North America with a string quartet.

In February 2020, Eugene Ryabchenko from Vital Remains became the band's new live drummer. Fleshgod Apocalypse was supposed to do another round of American shows with The Agonist in 2020, but this tour was for the most part cancelled due to the COVID-19 pandemic. The band has resorted to streaming on YouTube to host Q&A sessions with fans, as well as livestreaming a virtual concert at Bloom Studio in Rome in August. A video for an acoustic version of "The Day We'll Be Gone" was released on 23 October 2020, whereupon it was announced that soprano Veronica Bordacchini, guitarist Fabio Bartoletti and drummer Eugene Ryabchenko had officially joined the band.

On 18 December 2020, the band released a new EP titled No along with a new music video for the title track. In January 2021, they released a cover of Blue (Da Ba Dee).

Members

Current
 Francesco Paoli – lead vocals, rhythm guitar (2007–2009, 2017–present), drums (2009–2020), backing vocals, additional guitars (2009–2017)
 Paolo Rossi – bass, clean vocals (2007–present)
 Francesco Ferrini – piano, string arrangements, orchestral effects (2010–present; session/touring 2009–2010)
 Veronica Bordacchini – operatic vocals (2020–present; session/touring 2011–2020)
 Fabio Bartoletti – lead guitar, backing vocals (2020–present; session/touring 2017–2020)
 Eugene Ryabchenko – drums (2020–present; session/touring 2020)

Session/Touring
 Mauro Mercurio – drums (2009)
 David Folchitto – drums (2017–2020)

Former
 Tommaso Riccardi – lead vocals, rhythm guitar (2009–2017; session/touring 2009)
 Cristiano Trionfera – lead guitar, backing vocals (2007–2017)
 Francesco Struglia – drums (2007–2009)

Timeline

Discography

Studio albums
 Oracles (2009)
 Agony (2011)
 Labyrinth (2013)
 King (2016)
 Veleno (2019)

Demo
 Demo (2007)

Split
 Da Vinci Death Code (2008)

EPs and singles
 Mafia (2010)
 The Fool (2016)
 Sugar (2019)
 Carnivorous Lamb (2019)
 Monnalisa (2019)
 The Day We'll Be Gone (2020)
 No (2020)
 Blue (Turns To Red) (2021)

Collaborations
 The Great Tribulation (Epica feat. Fleshgod Apocalypse) (2022)
 Hate Über Alles (Kreator) (2022), on tracks 1 and 11.

References

External links

 Official Merchstore

2007 establishments in Italy
Italian death metal musical groups
Musical groups from Rome
Nuclear Blast artists
Italian symphonic metal musical groups
Technical death metal musical groups